Aleksandre Koshkadze  (born 4 December 1981) is a Georgian football player as a midfielder.

Honours
Georgian Cup: 2009

References

External links
 Player page on fcdinamo.ge
 
 

1981 births
Living people
Footballers from Georgia (country)
Association football midfielders
Georgia (country) under-21 international footballers
Georgia (country) international footballers
FC Sioni Bolnisi players
FC Torpedo Kutaisi players
FC Ameri Tbilisi players
FC Dinamo Batumi players
FC Borjomi players
FC Metalurgi Rustavi players
FC Meskheti Akhaltsikhe players
FC Dinamo Tbilisi players
FC Zugdidi players
FC Guria Lanchkhuti players
FC Dila Gori players
FC Kolkheti-1913 Poti players
FC Telavi players
Erovnuli Liga players